Nucleolus and neural progenitor protein (NEPRO) is a protein that in humans is encoded by the NEPRO gene.

NEPRO functions as a Notch effector for the development and maintenance of neural progenitor cells in the neocortex.

Biallelic variants in NEPRO can cause a rare ribosomopathy that affects the skeleton, resulting in severe short stature, brachydactyly, skin laxity, joint hypermobility, and joint dislocations.

References